Amorita is a town in Alfalfa County, Oklahoma, United States. The population was 37 at the time of the 2010 census.

History
Amorita was founded in September, 1901.  It is speculated that Amorita was likely named after the wife of railroad owner, Charles E. Ingersoll.  At the time of its founding, the area was part of the much larger Woods county.  It did not become part of present-day Alfalfa county until the time of statehood in 1907.

The town was established in Byron township in 1901 approximately two miles north of the existing town of Byron, by what was then known as the Choctaw Northern Railroad, later owned by the Chicago, Rock Island and Pacific.  In that year, the railroad became the county's first, connecting Amorita to the other Alfalfa county towns of Aline, Augusta, Ingersoll, Lambert, Driftwood, and on into Kansas.  City lots were sold when the railroad completed its rail line through the county in November 1901.

Although the initial sale of lots in November was small, within a month a butcher shop and a coal and grain business were established, and by February of the following year, two grain elevators were also opened.  Farming was the predominant economic activity in the area at the time.  The town was temporarily given a competitive advantage as a transportation hub because nearby Byron did not acquire its own competing railroad access (the Kansas City, Mexico and Orient Railway) until October 1902.

Residents voted to incorporate their town in May 1912.  In 1919 a fifty-thousand-dollar bond was approved to construct a new school building for the consolidated schools of Amorita and two other districts. In 1921, voters of both Byron and Amorita jointly approved the construction of power lines extending from Kansas to supply electricity to both their towns.

The railroad abandoned its line through the town in 1936.  In the 1960s, the Amorita school was consolidated into a single entity along with the nearby districts of Burlington, Byron, and Driftwood, which was located in Burlington.  By 1970, the population had fallen to 63 persons and by 2010, it had declined to just 37 residents.

Geography
Amorita lies along State Highway 58, between Byron to the south and the Kansas border to the north.

Demographics

As of the census of 2010, there were 37 people living in the town. There were 19 housing units in the town. The racial makeup of the town was 84.09% White, 6.82% African American, 4.55% Native American, and 4.55% from two or more races. Hispanic or Latino of any race were 2.27% of the population.

There were 14 households in the town, out of which 22.7% had children under the age of 18 living with them, 45.5% were married couples living together, 13.6% had a female householder with no husband present, and 36.4% were non-families. 36.4% of all households were made up of individuals, and 27.3% had someone living alone who was 65 years of age or older. The average household size was 2.00 and the average family size was 2.57.

In the town, the population was spread out, with 22.7% under the age of 18, 6.8% from 18 to 24, 18.2% from 25 to 44, 22.7% from 45 to 64, and 29.5% who were 65 years of age or older. The median age was 46 years. For every 100 females, there were 57.1 males. For every 100 females age 18 and over, there were 70.0 males.

The median income for a household in the town was $27,500, and the median income for a family was $38,125. Males had a median income of $21,875 versus $30,625 for females. The per capita income for the town was $12,137. There were 15.4% of families and 7.8% of the population living below the poverty line, including no one under the age of eighteen and none of those over 64.

References

Towns in Alfalfa County, Oklahoma
Towns in Oklahoma